The Bush Gang is an Australian children's series which first screened on the ABC in 1981.

Cast
 Danny Adcock
 Linda Hartley
 Penny Ramsey
 Simon Austin
 Joanne Long
 Vanessa Windsor

References

External links

The Bush Gang at AustLit

Australian children's television series
1981 Australian television series debuts